Jayden Adams (born 5 May 2001) is a South African professional soccer player who plays as a midfielder or winger for South African Premier Division side Stellenbosch.

Career
Born in Cape Town, Adams came through the academy of Stellenbosch before becoming the club's first academy graduate to sign a professional contract when he signed a long-term contract in August 2020. He made his senior debut later that month as a substitute in a 1–1 draw at home to Chippa United on 28 August.

Career statistics

Club

1 Includes Nedbank Cup matches.
2 Includes Telkom Knockout matches.
3 Includes MTN 8 matches.

Style of play
Adams plays as a midfielder, but can also play as a winger.

References

External links

Living people
2001 births
Soccer players from Cape Town
South African soccer players
Association football midfielders
Association football wingers
Stellenbosch F.C. players
South African Premier Division players